MTV News is the news production division of MTV. The service is available in the US with localized versions on MTV's global network. In February 2016, MTV Networks confirmed it would refresh the MTV News brand in 2016, to compete with the likes of BuzzFeed and Vice, however by mid-2017 MTV News was significantly downsized due to cutbacks.

MTV News content is available from respective MTV websites, Apps, YouTube and on-air.

In November 2018, MTV News began producing daily updates on Twitter titled MTV News: You Need To Know. Now titled MTV News Need To Know, the show has evolved to a digital series that covers trending topics from pop culture to social justice issues to electoral politics and beyond.

History

MTV News began in the late 1980s with the program The Week in Rock, hosted by long time Rolling Stone writer/music critic Kurt Loder, the first official MTV News correspondent. Since 1990, the opening riff to Megadeth's "Peace Sells" has been the main opening theme for The Week in Rock.

It first began covering political news in the 1992 American presidential elections, through its "Choose or Lose" campaign. Since then, MTV has run "Choose or Lose" for other presidential elections in the United States. For the 2008 election, Barack Obama and Hillary Clinton appeared on an MTV special to discuss the Iraq war.

Throughout the 2000s, MTV News began publishing digital editorial content via their website, Twitter feed, YouTube channel and Facebook page, offering information about MTV programming and music/pop-culture news aggregation. In November 2015, MTV introduced a new direction for its news department and hired Dan Fierman, former editorial director of Grantland, as MTV's editorial director and announced it would produce long-form journalism, think pieces and diversify its staff. However, in June 2017, MTV decided to restructure its news division with a greater focus on video, laying off much of their editorial staff. Later years saw a dramatic decrease in content produced by the outlet for its website or other avenues.

MTV News in the U.S.

Current and former correspondents

MTV News International 

When MTV launched in Europe it used a variation of MTV News US reports with localized European reporting. Upon regionalization of MTV channels in 1997, MTV begun to localize presenters and reporting depending on the MTV region. Its flagship programming in Europe consisted of a daily news update MTV News Update and a weekly highlights show called MTV News Weekend Edition; these ceased airing in the early 2000s. With the move of MTV towards more reality based programming MTV News bulletins became a short news bulletin on the hours between 16:00 to 22:00 Monday to Friday on some MTV channels.

As of July 2013, Viacom International Media Networks has launched a new news bulletin which utilises the existing MTV News UK broadcasts. These MTV News International bulletins air on the majority of MTV channels (with exception to MTV US, MTV Canada, MTV Italy, MTV Brazil, MTV Japan, MTV China and MTV Latin America) in the English language which are either dubbed or subtitled. During MTV News broadcasts viewers are directed to mtvnews.co.uk for further news updates. The news bulletins are presented by MTV UK presenters.

MTV Networks confirmed it would relaunch the MTV Brand and its content in mid-2016, MTV have yet to confirm whether this will impact on news broadcasts outside the US.

By 2016, MTV News International was significantly reduced with news reports confined to social media and some localized MTV websites in the UK, the Benelux, Australia and New Zealand.

Former International Presenters

Canada 
 Aliya-Jasmine Sovani, Johnny Hockin, Sharlene Chiu

Previous presenters

United Kingdom 

  Tim Kash
  Becca Dudley
  Bluey Robinson

Italy 
  Jasper Lewis Vignone

Latin America 
 Ilana Sod
 Jazz
 Nicolás Artusi
 Javier Andrade

Ireland 
   Laura Whitmore
   Nick Lee Mease

Greece 
   Estel

Pan-European 
  Laura Whitmore
  Jasmine Dotiwala

Turkey
 Alper Etiş (2006–2010)

Germany 
 Markus Kavka
 Karolin

The Netherlands 
 Dennis Weening
 Evelien Bosch

Australia 
  Maz Compton
  Darren McMullen 
  Erin McNaught 
  Ruby Rose

Lithuania 
  Jonas Bačelis

Russia 
  Aleksandr Anatolievich
  Irena Ponaroshku
  Igor Lantratov

References

External links
 MTV News
 MTV News UK

 
Entertainment news shows in the United States